Oisín Mullin (born 11 February 2000) is an Irish Gaelic footballer who plays for Kilmaine and the Mayo county team. Mullin will switch codes and join the Geelong Football Club in the Australian Football League for the 2023 season.

Gaelic football career

Club
On 12  October 2019, Mullin was in the half back line as Kilmaine went up against Castlebar Mitchels B in the final of the Mayo Junior Football Championship. Mullin scored 0-3 but Castlebar were winners by 0-14 to 0-11. As second teams are not allowed to compete in the provincial championships, Kilmaine represented Mayo in the Connacht Junior Club Football Championship. On 16 November, Mullin was in midfield as Kilmaine beat St Michael's of Sligo in the Connacht final. Mullin scored 2 points and was named man of the match after the 5-18 to 0-3 win.

On 19 September 2020, Mullin was in midfield as Kilmaine faced Kilmeena in the final of the Mayo Junior Football Championship. Mullin scored a point as Kilmaine came out on top by a single point.

Inter-county

Minor and under-20
On 17 June 2018, Mullin was at centre back as the Mayo under-20 team faced Roscommon in the Connacht final. Mullin went off with an injury in the second half, but Mayo ran out winners by sixteen points. Mullin didn't feature for the rest of the championship and Mayo went on to lose the All-Ireland final to Kildare.

On 10 July 2019, Mullin was at corner back for his second successive Connacht final, this time against Galway. Galway were six-point winners on the day. Mullin was named in the top 20 players in the under-20 championship at the end of the season.

Senior
Mullin joined the senior squad in 2020, and made his championship debut in a first round win over Leitrim the same year. On 15 November, Mullin was at corner-back as Mayo faced Galway in the Connacht final. Mullin claimed his first Connacht championship after a one-point win. Mayo went on to reach the All-Ireland final, where they faced Dublin on December 20. Dublin claimed their sixth consecutive title after a 2–14 to 0–15 win. After the final, Mullin was named on The Sunday Game Team of the Year. Mullin was later selected at corner back on the All Star team, and also claimed the Young Footballer of the Year award.

On 25 July 2021, Mullin started his second consecutive Connacht final, with Mayo facing Galway once again. A strong second half landed Mayo's second provincial title in a row. On 13 September, Mullin started his second All-Ireland final, with Mayo coming up against Tyrone, with Mayo coming up short once again. Mullin was later named Young Footballer of the Year for a second time.

AFL career
On 4 November 2021, it was reported that Mullin would be joining the Geelong Cats club in the Australian Football League, with the club confirming the signing six days later. However, in January 2022, it was confirmed that Mullin would not join Geelong and would continue to play with Mayo. 

In November 2022, after staying with Mayo for the year, it was announced that Mullin would join Geelong for the 2023 season.

Honours
Mayo
 Connacht Senior Football Championship (2): 2020, 2021
 Connacht Under-20 Football Championship (1): 2018

Kilmaine
 Connacht Junior Club Football Championship (1): 2019
 Mayo Junior Football Championship (1): 2020

Individual
 All Star Award (1): 2020
 All Stars Young Footballer of the Year (2): 2020, 2021
 The Sunday Game Team of the Year (1): 2020
 Eirgrid 20 Under-20 Award (1): 2019

References

Living people
2000 births
Mayo inter-county Gaelic footballers